The 2008–09 Wilfrid Laurier Golden Hawks women's hockey team represented Wilfrid Laurier University in the 2008-09 Canadian Interuniversity Sport women's hockey season.  The Golden Hawks were coached by Rick Osborne. Assisting Osborne was Jim Rayburn. The Golden Hawks played their home games at Sunlife Financial Arena. The Golden Hawks were a member of the Ontario University Athletics and qualified for the Canadian Interuniversity Sport women's ice hockey championship game.

Exhibition

Regular season

Roster

Schedule

Tournaments
The Golden Hawks competed in the Bisons UMSU Tournament. In the Championship Game, Manitoba beat the Golden Hawks 3-2 in Overtime.

Player stats

Skaters

Goaltenders

Postseason

OUA Semifinal

OUA Finals

CIS Championships

Awards and honors
Andrea Ironside, 2008/2009 Women's Hockey OUA First Team All-Star
Andrea Ironside, 2008/2009 Women's Hockey CIS Championship Tournament All-Star
Andrea Ironside, Monday, November 24, 2008, Laurier Athlete of the Week

All-Canadian honors
Defence - Andrea Bevan, First Team
Forward - Andrea Ironside, Second Team

References

External links
Official site

Golden Hawks
Wilfrid Laurier
Wil